Whirlwind is a Sri Lankan rock music band that has been active since 1995.

History 
Whirlwind was formed in 1995 in Sri Lanka with four members: Misha Wickramanayake (vocals), Chanaka Abeyratne (guitar), Chandimal Fernando (bass), and Crescent Kumaratunge (drums).

Their style of heavy metal music, which incorporates traditional Sri Lankan folk rhythms and melodies, has been credited with creating a new music genre called Sri Metal.

Discography 
 Pain (2003)
 Agony (2007)

Music videos 
 "Mindbender"
 "Vacant Life"
 "Horizon" (Unplugged)
 "One Last Time"

Live performances 
Whirlwind has played at the annual "Rock Fest" and "Sri Lankan Metal Festival".

References

External links
 Whirlwind promotes rock
 Rockalution from  Whirlwind

Rap rock groups
Rap metal musical groups